Rik or RIK may refer to:

Rik 
 Rik (given name), a masculine given name
 Rik, Iran, a village
 "Rik" (song), 2016, by Albin Johnsén and Mattias Andréasson
 Riq, tambourine used in Arabic music
 Rik (Ukrainian), Ukrainian term used to say about year

RIK 
 Carrillo Airport, Costa Rica
 Cyprus Broadcasting Corporation
 Redbergslids IK, a Swedish handball team